Loeb Stadium was a stadium in Columbian Park in Lafayette, Indiana, United States. It was primarily used for baseball and had most recently been the home of the Lafayette Aviators of the Prospect League.

Previously, it was the home of Ohio Valley Redcoats of the independent Frontier League, and later the Lafayette Leopards of the now defunct Great Central League.

History
Opened in 1940 as Columbian Park Recreational Center, Loeb Stadium had a capacity of 3,500 people. From 1943 until 1945, the stadium hosted Spring Training for Major League Baseball's Cleveland Indians when teams were forced to hold their training closer to their home cities due to restrictions in place as a result of the United States' participation in World War II. At that time, the stadium was home to a Class A affiliate of the Indians.

It also hosted the minor league Lafayette Red Sox, a founding franchise of the Midwest League in 1956. In 1957, the Red Sox moved to Waterloo, Iowa, and later to Lansing, Michigan, where they are known today as the Lansing Lugnuts.

In amateur baseball, it was home to the Colt League Baseball World Series 48 out of 49 years (1969-1971 and 1973-2017) until the event moved to Rent One Park in Marion, Illinois in 2018. The Jefferson High School Bronchos use the stadium for their home games, competing in games sanctioned by the Indiana High School Athletic Association (IHSAA). It has hosted the IHSAA baseball state finals four times, most recently in 2005.

For the 2016 season, the Jamestown Jammers moved to Lafayette and began play in the Prospect League as the Aviators.

Replacement
At the conclusion of the 2019 Prospect League season, the stadium was closed and demolished to make way for a new stadium that is scheduled to open in early 2021. During that time, the Aviators were supposed to play at Purdue University's Alexander Field; however, their 2020 season was suspended when Purdue closed their athletic facilities due to the COVID-19 pandemic.

The project, estimated to cost approximately $17 million, will see the stadium's configuration flipped, placing home plate in what is currently center field. The current seating area will be removed and be made part of Columbian Park surrounding the stadium. New suites and outdoor group seating areas will be added. The stadium's grass playing surface will be replaced with a synthetic turf, which will allow the facility to host additional types of events, and the seating capacity will decrease to 2,500 from its current 3,500. Additionally, the playing surface will be lowered by seven feet, allowing for improved sightlines from all stadium seats. The project will be paid for using economic development income tax (EDIT) rather than property taxes.

References

Buildings and structures in Lafayette, Indiana
Baseball venues in Indiana
High school baseball venues in the United States
1940 establishments in Indiana
2019 disestablishments in Indiana
Sports venues completed in 1940
Sports venues demolished in 2019
Mississippi-Ohio Valley League
Defunct Midwest League ballparks
Defunct baseball venues in the United States